Soumya Bourouaha (born 16 March 1964) is an Algerian-born French politician from the French Communist Party. She became the Member of Parliament for Seine-Saint-Denis's 4th constituency in the 2022 French legislative election.

References

See also 

 List of deputies of the 16th National Assembly of France

1964 births
Living people
Deputies of the 16th National Assembly of the French Fifth Republic
21st-century French women politicians
21st-century French politicians
French Communist Party politicians
Women members of the National Assembly (France)
Members of Parliament for Seine-Saint-Denis
Algerian emigrants to France
French people of Algerian descent
People from Ghazaouet